The 2018–19 Piala Indonesia (known as the Krating Daeng Piala Indonesia for sponsorship reasons) was the seventh edition of Piala Indonesia. It began with the first round on 8 May 2018, and concluded with the finals on 21 July and 6 August 2019. The winner would qualify for the play-off round of the 2020 AFC Cup.

2012 Piala Indonesia winners Persibo were the defending champions, as there were no competition from 2013 to 2017 for various reasons, but they were eliminated in the first round by Madura United.

PSM won the competition by defeating Persija 2–1 on aggregate in the two-legged finals, winning their first title.

Participating teams
The following 128 teams participated for the competition:

Format and seeding
Teams enter the competition at various stages, as follows:
 First stage (one-legged fixtures, the lower league team as home team)
 First round: 128 teams from Liga 1, Liga 2, and Liga 3 divided into 16 zones, started the tournament
 Second round: the 64 winners divided into 8 zones
 Second stage (two-legged fixtures)
 Round of 32: the 32 winners divided into 4 zones
 Round of 16: the 16 winners divided into 2 zones
 Final stage (two-legged fixtures without zone division)
 Quarter-finals: the 8 round of 16 winners are inserted into a bracket
 Semi-finals
 Finals

Round and draw dates
The schedule of each round was as follows:

First stage

First round
The first round was featured by 128 teams. The first round matches were played from 8 May to 2 September 2018. Match list sorted by zone. All times are WIB (UTC+7).

Second round
The second round was featured by 64 teams which were the winners of the first round. The second round matches was played from 20 November 2018 to 5 January 2019. Match list sorted by zone. All times are WIB (UTC+7).

Second stage

Round of 32
For the round of 32, the first legs was played from 23 January to 5 February 2019 and the second from 31 January to 16 February 2019. The division shown for each team is the same as they registered from the first round. Match list sorted by zone. All times are WIB (UTC+7).
First leg

Second leg

Round of 16
For the round of 16, the first legs was played from 15 to 19 February 2019 and the second from 20 to 24 February 2019. Match list sorted by zone. All times are WIB (UTC+7).

First leg

Second leg

Final stage

Bracket

Quarter-finals
For the quarter-finals, the first legs was played from 24 April – 19 June 2019 and the second from 3 May – 27 June 2019. All times are WIB (UTC+7).

First leg

Second leg

Semi-finals
For the semi-finals, the first legs was played from 29 to 30 June and the second from 6–7 July 2019. All times are WIB (UTC+7).

First leg

Second leg

Finals

PSM won 2–1 on aggregate.

Statistics

Top goalscorers

Awards
 Best young player was awarded to Asnawi Bahar (PSM).
 Best player was awarded to Zulham Zamrun (PSM).
 Top scorer were awarded to Amido Baldé (Persebaya) and Zulham Zamrun (PSM) with 10 goals each.
 Fair play team was awarded to Madura United.

See also
2018 Liga 1
2018 Liga 2
2018 Liga 3
2019 Liga 1
2019 Liga 2
2019 Liga 3

Notes

References

External links
 Piala Indonesia at PSSI website

Piala Indonesia seasons
Indonesia
Piala Indonesia
Piala Indonesia